This disability rights timeline lists events outside the United States relating to the civil rights of people with disabilities, including court decisions, the passage of legislation, activists' actions, significant abuses of people with disabilities, and the founding of various organizations. Although the disability rights movement itself began in the 1960s, advocacy for the rights of people with disabilities started much earlier and continues to the present.

Prior to the 1700s
 Ancient Greece – A pharmakós (plural pharmakoi) in ancient Greek religion was the ritualistic sacrifice or exile of a human scapegoat or victim. A cripple, a slave or a criminal was chosen and expelled from the community at times of disaster (famine, invasion or plague) or at times of calendrical crisis. It was believed that this would bring about purification. On the first day of the Thargelia, a festival of Apollo at Athens, two men, the Pharmakoi, were led out as if to be sacrificed as an expiation. Some scholia state that pharmakoi were actually sacrificed (thrown from a cliff or burned), but many modern scholars reject this, arguing that the earliest source for the pharmakos (the iambic satirist Hipponax) shows the pharmakoi being beaten and stoned, but not executed. A more plausible explanation would be that sometimes they were executed and sometimes not, depending on the attitude of the victim. For instance, a deliberate unrepentant murderer would most likely be put to death.
 1200s – In the 13th century, England declared people with intellectual disabilities to be incapable of making decisions or managing their affairs.
 1324 – The idea of insanity in English law dates from 1324, when the Statute de Praerogativa Regis allowed the King to take the lands of "idiots and lunatics."

1700s
 1714 – In English law, the Vagrancy Act 1714 allowed two Justices of the Peace to confine a dangerous lunatic. 
 1729 – In 1729 punishment was recommended for people with physical disabilities, whether they were born with disabilities or acquired them later in life, who appeared in public. These concepts were covered by what were colloquially known as unsightly beggar ordinances.
 1774 – The Madhouses Act 1774 (14 Geo. 3 c.49) was an Act of the Parliament of Great Britain, which set out a legal framework for regulating "madhouses" (insane asylums). It was repealed by the Madhouses Act 1828.

1800s
 1800 – The Criminal Lunatics Act 1800 (39 & 40 Geo 3 c 94) was an Act of the Parliament of Great Britain, that required and established a set procedure for the indefinite detention of mentally ill offenders. It was passed through the House of Commons in direct reaction to the trial of James Hadfield, who attempted to assassinate King George III.
 1808 – The County Asylums Act 1808 formed mental health law in England and Wales from 1808 to 1845. Notably, the Asylums Act established public mental asylums in Britain. The Act is also known as Mr. Wynn's Act, after Charles Watkin Williams-Wynn, member of parliament for Montgomeryshire, who promoted the act.
 1811 – The Marriage of Lunatics Act, 1811 of Ireland declared that any marriage entered into by a certified lunatic was void. This law was repealed by the Assisted Decision-Making (Capacity) Bill 2013.
 1815 – The 1815 Act to Regulate Madhouses in Scotland (55 Geo. III c. 69) made provision for patients paying money to be held in institutions that were run for a profit by private individuals.
 1815 – The Criminal Lunatics Amendment Act was enacted by the Parliament of the United Kingdom as "An Act for the Safe Custody of Insane Persons Charged with Offenses".
 1817 – The Irish Lunatic Asylums for the Poor Act made legislative provisions of public asylums for all of Ireland.
 1819 – The Pauper Lunatics Act 1819 was enacted, "for making provision for the better care of pauper lunatics in England".
 1828 – The County Asylums Act 1828 was enacted in England as "An Act to amend the Laws for the Erection and Regulation of County Lunatic Asylums. And more effectually to provide for the care and maintenance of Pauper and Criminal Lunatics in England".
 1828 – The Madhouses Act 1828 was enacted in England, and it reconstituted the Metropolitan Commissioners in Lunacy and declared there should be fifteen of them, with five of those being physicians. It also repealed the Madhouses Act 1774.
 1828 – The Chancery Lunatics Property Act was enacted as "An Act for extending the Acts passed in the forty-third and fifty- ninth years of the reign of his late majesty King George the third, for the sale of mortgages of estates of persons found lunatics by inquisition taken in England and Ireland, so as to authorise such sale and mortgage for some purposes; and for rendering Inquisitions on Commissions of Lunacy taken in England available in Ireland, and like Inquisitions taken in Ireland available in England."
 1832 – The 1832 Madhouses Act was enacted by the Parliament of the United Kingdom.
 1840s – The M'Naghten rule (pronounced, and sometimes spelled, "McNaughton") is any variant of the 1840s jury instruction in a criminal case when there is a defense of insanity: 
"that every man is to be presumed to be sane, and... that to establish a defense on the ground of insanity, it must be clearly proved that, at the time of the committing of the act, the party accused was laboring under such a defect of reason, from disease of the mind, as not to know the nature and quality of the act he was doing; or if he did know it, that he did not know he was doing what was wrong." The rules so formulated as M'Naghten's Case 1843 10 C & F 200 have been a standard test for criminal liability in relation to mentally disordered defendants in common law jurisdictions ever since, with some minor adjustments. When the tests set out by the Rules are satisfied, the accused may be adjudged "not guilty by reason of insanity" or "guilty but insane" and the sentence may be a mandatory or discretionary (but usually indeterminate) period of treatment in a secure hospital facility, or otherwise at the discretion of the court (depending on the country and the offence charged) instead of a punitive disposal. The insanity defence is recognized in Australia, Canada, England and Wales, Hong Kong, India, the Republic of Ireland, New Zealand, and Norway (as well as most U.S. states with the exception of Idaho, Kansas, Montana, Utah, and Vermont) but not all of these jurisdictions still use the M'Naghten Rules.
 1845 – The Lunacy Act 1845 (8 & 9 Vict., c. 100) and the County Asylums Act 1845 formed mental health law in England and Wales from 1845 to 1890. The Lunacy Act's most important provision was a change in the status of mentally ill people to patients. As well, the Lunacy Act created the Commissioners in Lunacy or Lunacy Commission, a UK public body established to oversee asylums and the welfare of mentally ill people. It succeeded the Metropolitan Commissioners in Lunacy. The Lunacy Act of 1845 was passed through Parliament simultaneously with the 1845 County Asylums Act. The two acts were dependent on each other. The Lunacy Act established the Lunacy Commission and the County Asylums Act set forth most of the provisions as to what was to be monitored within the asylums and helped establish the public network of the county asylums. Like the Lunacy Act, there had been several drafts of this act passed before 1845 and several afterward as well. The most notable of these were the 1808, and the 1853 County Asylum Acts. The Lunacy Act itself was amended several times after its conception. There was a new version written in both 1846 and 1847. Both of these versions were actually repealed by the 1853 County Asylums Act. The importance of these two acts together is that they consolidated Lunacy Law in England. However, no legislation has ever combined the entirety of Lunacy Law. Both of these acts were the basis for Lunacy Law in England until 1890 when both of them were repealed by the Lunacy Act of 1890.
 1871 – The Lunacy Regulation (Ireland) Act 1871 was created to manage and protect the estate of "lunatics". It was repealed by the Assisted Decision-Making (Capacity) Bill 2013.
 1883 – The Trial of Lunatics Act 1883 is an Act of the Parliament of the United Kingdom, allowing the jury to return a verdict that the defendant was guilty, but insane at the time, and should be kept in custody as a "criminal lunatic". This Act was passed at the request of Queen Victoria, who, the target of frequent attacks by individuals with mental illness, demanded that the verdict be changed from "not guilty" so as to act as a deterrent to other "lunatics"; the phrasing of "guilty of the act or omission charged, but insane so as not to be responsible, according to law, for his actions." remained in use until the Criminal Procedure (Insanity) Act 1964. It was cited in 1991 in the case of R v Burgess regarding the automatism defence. The form of special verdict provided for by this Act was commonly known as guilty but insane. This expression was not an accurate description of that verdict.
 1886 – The Idiots Act 1886 (49 Vict.c.25) was an act of Parliament of the United Kingdom. It was intended to give "... facilities for the care, education, and training of Idiots and Imbeciles". The Act made, for the first time, the distinction between "lunatics", "idiots", and "imbeciles" for the purpose of making entry into education establishments easier and for defining the ways they were cared for. Before the Act, learning institutions for idiots and imbeciles were seen as either "licensed houses" or "registered hospitals" for lunatics, for which the parents of children hoping to enter would have to complete a form stating that they were "a lunatic, an idiot, or a person of unsound mind". Additionally, they were required to answer irrelevant questions and present two medical certificates. The Act was repealed by the Mental Deficiency Act 1913, by which time two further classifications had been introduced: "feeble-minded people" and "moral defectives".
 1886 – The Lunacy (Vacating of Seats) Act 1886 (49 Vict.c.16) was an Act of the Parliament of the United Kingdom. It provided a mechanism for a Member of Parliament who was judged to be of unsound mind to be removed from his seat.
 1890 –  The Lunacy Act of 1890 repealed the Lunacy Act 1845 (8 & 9 Vict., c. 100) and the County Asylums Act 1845, which had formed mental health law in England and Wales.

1900s
 1902 – From the early 1880s until the 1970s, American cities had unsightly beggar ordinances known colloquially as ugly laws. These laws deemed it illegal for "any person, who is diseased, maimed, mutilated or deformed in any way, so as to be an unsightly or disgusting object, to expose himself to public view." In 1902, an ugly law similar to that of the United States was enacted in the City of Manila in the Philippines. This law was similar to those of the United States, being written in English and during a time when Manila was under American control, and included the common phrasing "no person who is diseased". This was one of the first ordinances to be written under American control. Other ordinances dealt with hygiene reform and considered unsightly beggars part of this indicative.
 1909 – Regulations were introduced at the Cantonal Asylum in Bern, which allowed those deemed 'unfit' and with strong sexual inclinations, including some disabled people, to be mandatorily sterilized. In a particular instance, several men and women, including epileptics, were castrated, some of whom voluntarily requested it.

1910s
 1913 – The Mental Deficiency Act 1913 was an act of the United Kingdom which made provisions for the institutional treatment of people deemed to be "feeble-minded" and "moral defectives". "It proposed an institutional separation so that mental defectives should be taken out of Poor Law institutions and prisons into newly established colonies." It was repealed by the Mental Health Act 1959. The 1913 act created the Board of Control for Lunacy and Mental Deficiency, which was a United Kingdom body overseeing the treatment of the mentally ill. The Board was created to replace the Commissioners in Lunacy, under the Home Office but independent in that it reported to the Lord Chancellor (who would investigate breaches of care and integrity). It was transferred to the Ministry of Health by the Ministry of Health Act 1919 and reorganized in 1930. The Board consisted of: a chairman, two Senior Medical Commissioners, one Senior Legal Commissioner, six Commissioners (lawyers and doctors), six Inspectors and administrative staff. By law, at least one of these had to be a woman. The Commissioners of the board went round the country seeing that those detained under the various mental and mental deficiency Acts were legally in custody and that care was proper and moneys and other properties owned by patients were not being misused or stolen. The board was based in Northumberland Avenue, London, until 1939 when it was moved to Hobart House, Grosvenor Place. Its responsibility was limited to England and Wales. Its functions were transferred to the Minister of Health by the National Health Service Act 1946.
 1915 – People v. Schmidt, 216 N.Y. 324 (1915), is a British criminal case interpreting "wrong" in the M'Naghten rule for an insanity defense. The M'naghten rule included that a person was not guilty because of insanity if, because of a mental disorder, the defendant was not able to know her act was wrong. The court interpreted "wrong" to refer to knowledge the act was morally wrong, not knowledge that it was legally wrong. The court wrote, "The [M'Naghten] court expressly held that a defendant who knew nothing of the law would nonetheless be responsible if he know that the act was wrong, by which, therefore they must have meant, if he knew it was morally wrong... There is nothing to justify the belief that the words right and wrong, when they became limited by M'Naghten's case to the right and wrong of a particular act, cast off their meaning in terms of morals, and became terms of pure legality." The court also wrote on knowledge of moral wrongness in the case of a delusion of a deific decree, that God ordered a criminal act, when defendant knows the act is morally and legally wrong, "It seems a mockery to say that, within the meaning of the statute, she knows that the act is wrong." The court wrote that if a person has an insane delusion that "he has a command from the Almighty to kill, it is difficult to understand how such a man can know that it is wrong for him to do so."

1920s
 1920: The Blind Persons Act 1920 passes in the United Kingdom. It is the first legislation worldwide in support of equal rights for disabled people.
 1928–1972: In 1928, the Legislative Assembly of Alberta, Canada, enacted the Sexual Sterilization Act. The Act, drafted to protect the gene pool, allowed for sterilization of mentally disabled persons in order to prevent the transmission of undesirable traits to offspring. The Sexual Sterilization Act was repealed in 1972. In 1995, Leilani Muir sued the Province of Alberta for forcing her to be sterilized against her will and without her permission under the Act in 1959, when she was institutionalized at the Provincial Training School for Mental Defectives. Since Muir's case, the Alberta government has apologized for the forced sterilization of over 2,800 people under the Act. Nearly 850 Albertans who were sterilized under the Sexual Sterilization Act were awarded C$142 million in damages.

1930s
 1930 – The Mental Treatment Act 1930 was an Act of the Parliament of the United Kingdom that permitted voluntary admission to, and outpatient treatment within, psychiatric hospitals. It also replaced the term "asylum" with "mental hospital". It was repealed by the Mental Health Act 1959.
 1933 – 1973: In 1933 British Columbia legislated the Sexual Sterilization Act, which was repealed in 1973, and which closely resembled the Sexual Sterilization Act of Alberta, although the practices differed. The Sexual Sterilization Act of British Columbia created a Board of Eugenics, consisting of a judge, psychiatrist, and social worker. The Board was granted the authority to order the sterilization, with consent, of any inmate recommended to them by a superintendent, who "if discharged…without being subjected to an operation for sexual sterilization would be likely to produce or bear children who by reason of inheritance would have a tendency to serious mental disease or mental deficiency." Many of the individuals presented for sterilization under the province's eugenics program came through Riverview Hospital (Essondale). "[H]istorian Angus McLaren has estimated that in British Columbia...a few hundred individuals were sterilized".
 1933 – The Law for the Prevention of Genetically Diseased Offspring (Ger. "Gesetz zur Verhütung erbkranken Nachwuchses") or "Sterilisation Law" was a statute in Nazi Germany enacted on July 14, 1933 (and made active in January 1934) which allowed the compulsory sterilisation of any citizen who in the opinion of a "Genetic Health Court" (Gr. Erbgesundheitsgericht) had a list of alleged genetic disorders – many of which were not, in fact, genetic. The elaborate interpretive commentary on the law was written by three dominant figures in the racial hygiene movement: Ernst Rüdin, Arthur Gütt and the lawyer Falk Ruttke. The law itself was based on a 'model' American law developed by Harry H. Laughlin. There were three amendments by 1935, most making minor adjustments to how the statute operated or clarifying bureaucratic aspects (such as who paid for the operations). The most significant changes allowed the Higher Court to renounce a patient's right to appeal, and to fine physicians who did not report patients who they knew would qualify for sterilisation under the law. Along with the law, Adolf Hitler personally decriminalised abortion in case of fetuses having racial or hereditary defects for doctors, while the abortion of healthy "pure" German, "Aryan" unborn remained strictly forbidden.
 1934 – 1975: Compulsory sterilisation in Sweden (Swedish: Tvångssterilisering i Sverige) occurred between 1934 and 1975. Originally the aim of the sterilisation policy was to protect society and it targeted the so-called feeble-minded or other individuals who were considered unfit; from the 1950s and onwards the law came to be used mostly in the interest of the individual, for social or medical reasons, under varying degrees of pressure from doctors and social workers. Two indications for compulsory sterilisation were: 1. Eugenic indication meant sterilisation could be done if a person's offspring would receive undesired genes for insanity, severe illness or physical handicap of other kind. 2. Social indication allowed sterilisation for someone evidently unsuitable to foster a child due to mental illness, being feebleminded or other distortion of the psyche, or having an asocial lifestyle. According to the 2000 governmental report, 21,000 people were estimated to have been forcibly sterilised, and 6,000 were coerced into a 'voluntary' sterilisation while the nature of a further 4,000 cases could not be determined. The Swedish state subsequently paid out damages to victims who contacted the authorities and asked for compensation.
 1939 – 1945: Aktion T4 (German) was the postwar designation for a programme of mass murder through involuntary euthanasia in Nazi Germany, which ran officially from September 1939 to August 1941, during which the recorded 70,273 people were killed at various extermination centres located at psychiatric hospitals in Germany and Austria, along with those in occupied Poland. About half of the victims were from church-run asylums. Under the programme certain German physicians were authorized to select patients "deemed incurably sick, after most critical medical examination" and then administer to them a "mercy death". In October 1939 Adolf Hitler signed a "euthanasia decree" backdated to 1 September 1939 that authorized Reichsleiter Philipp Bouhler, the chief of his Chancellery, (not the Reich Chancellery Reichskanzlei) and Karl Brandt, Hitler's personal physician, to carry out the killing. After the nominal end of the programme, physicians in German and Austrian facilities continued many of the practices of Aktion T4, until the defeat of Germany in 1945. Robert Lifton and Michael Burleigh estimated that twice the official number of T4 victims may have perished before the end of the war. The estimated range now is between 200,000 and 250,000 unofficial victims of the policy upon the arrival of Allied troops in Germany.

1940s
 1940 – The Race Eugenic Protection Law of Japan was submitted from 1934 to 1938 to the Diet. This law limited compulsory sterilization to "inherited mental disease", promoted genetic screening and restricted birth control access. According to Matsubara Yoko, from 1940 to 1945, 454 people were sterilized in Japan under this law.
 1945 – 1955: The Vipeholm experiments were a series of human experiments where patients of Vipeholm Hospital for intellectually disabled people in Lund, Sweden, were fed large amounts of sweets to provoke dental caries (1945–1955). The experiments were sponsored both by the sugar industry and the dentist community, in an effort to determine whether carbohydrates affected the formation of cavities. The experiments provided extensive knowledge about dental health and resulted in enough empirical data to link the intake of sugar to dental caries. However, today they are considered to have violated the principles of medical ethics.
 1946 – In this year, newly reconstructed German courts tried members of the Hadamar psychiatric hospital staff for the murders of nearly 15,000 German citizens at the facility. Adolf Wahlmann and Irmgard Huber, the chief physician and the head nurse, were convicted.
 1947 – The School Education Law (Law No. 26) was enacted in Japan, and it provided education for disabled children such as general classes, special classes, non-residential classes, special schools and itinerant teaching, etc.
 1947 – The Workmen's Accident Compensation Insurance Law (Law No. 50) was enacted in Japan, and it provided disability pension and disability lump-sum payments, as well as welfare services such as special allowance, medical services, health care, supply of prosthetic appliance, etc.
 1947 – The Mail Law (Law No. 165) was enacted in Japan, and it provided that postage for Braille paper and recorded mail for visually impaired persons are free of charge, and parcels for disabled people can be mailed at half the cost. The postage for periodicals published by disabled person groups can be mailed at a small charge.
 1948 – In December 1946 an American military tribunal (commonly called the Doctors' trial) prosecuted 23 German doctors and administrators for their roles in war crimes and crimes against humanity. These crimes included the systematic killing of those deemed "unworthy of life", including people who had mental disabilities, were institutionalized for their mentally ill, and who had physical impairments. After 140 days of proceedings, including the testimony of 85 witnesses and the submission of 1,500 documents, in August 1947 the court pronounced 16 of the defendants guilty. Seven were sentenced to death and executed on 2 June 1948.
 1948 – According to the Eugenic Protection Law in Japan (1948), sterilization could be enforced on criminals "with genetic predisposition to commit crime", patients with genetic diseases including mild ones such as total color-blindness, hemophilia, albinism and ichthyosis, and mental affections such as schizophrenia, manic-depression possibly deemed occurrent in their opposition and epilepsy. The mental sicknesses were added in 1952. The provisions also allowed for the surgical sterilization of women, when the woman, her spouse, or family member within the 4th degree of kinship had a serious genetic disorder, and where pregnancy would endanger the life of the woman. The operation required consent of the woman, her spouse and the approval of the Prefectural Eugenic Protection Council. The law also allowed for abortion for pregnancies in the cases of rape, leprosy, hereditary-transmitted disease, or if the physician determined that the fetus would not be viable outside of the womb. Again, the consent of the woman and her spouse were necessary. Despite the unambiguous wording of the law, the law was used by local authorities as justification for measures enforcing forced sterilization and abortions upon people with certain genetic disorders, as well as leprosy, as well as an excuse for legalized discrimination against people with physical and intellectual disabilities. In 1996 this law was replaced by the Maternity Protection Law, which eliminated the provision based on eugenics.
 1949 – The Law for the Welfare of Physically Disabled Persons (Law No. 283) was enacted in Japan, and it provided the issuing of a "physically disabled persons' handbook", various counseling services, a grant of prosthetic appliances such as wheelchairs, canes, hearing aids and artificial limbs, technical aids for daily living such as bathtubs, toilet facility, beds and communication aids (e. g. talking machines and word processors), rehabilitation training, services necessary for participation in society such as sign language interpreter, translation Braille, guide helper and modification of motor vehicles, work opportunities, specialized facilities for nursing care, and living places.

1950s
 1950 – The Inheritance Tax Law (Law No. 73) was enacted in Japan, and it provided that inheritance tax is reduced in the case of disabled persons' heir. Up to 70 years of age – ¥60,000 per year (¥120,000 for specified disabled persons.)
 1950 – The Local Tax Law (Law No. 226) was enacted in Japan, and it provided that Local Resident Tax is reduced (disabled persons with annual incomes of ¥1,250,000 or less get a tax exemption). The Local Resident Tax exemption amounts are as follows: Specified disabled persons – ¥280,000 Other disabled persons – ¥260,000 There are cases of reduction or exemption from automobile taxes, light mobile taxes and automobile purchase taxes.
 1950 – The Daily Life Security Law (Law No. 144) was enacted in Japan, and it provided that families who have difficulties in daily life because of their low income are given Public Assistant Benefit to ensure the minimum standard of living, and there is a system of supplemental allowance for disabled persons according to the condition of disability.
 1950 – The USSR officially banned the procedure of lobotomy in 1950, on the initiative of Vasily Gilyarovsky.
 1950 – The Public Housing Law (Law No. 193) was enacted in Japan, and it provided that when living in public housing, disabled persons are given special consideration. There is a standard of larger living space for families with persons with disabilities. In addition, local public entities give priority in providing to disabled persons public housing and lowering of rent.
 1952 – In English law, in R v Windle [1952] 2 QB 826 evidence proved that although the killer did have a mental illness he knew that he was committing a crime. The trial judge thus refused to let the insanity defense go to the jury and this decision was upheld on appeal. 
 1954 – The Employees' Pension Law (Law No. 115) was enacted in Japan, and it provided that: According to the degree of the insured disability, Employee Disability Pension and Disability Allowance (a one time lump sum for minimal disabilities) are paid.
 1954 - World Leprosy Day was started in 1954 to draw awareness to those affected by leprosy.
 1957 – The Special Measures Act concerning Temporary Taxation (Law No. 26) was enacted in Japan, and it provided that regarding the Income Tax Law of 1965 (see below), those living severely disabled persons may get supplemental allowance. Supplemental allowance – ¥300,000
 1957 – Section 2 of the Homicide Act 1957 of the United Kingdom states:
(1) Where a person kills or is party to a killing of another, he shall not be convicted of murder if he was suffering from an abnormality of mental functioning which – 
(a) arose from a medical condition
(b) substantially impaired D's ability to do one or more of the things mentioned in subsection (1A), and
(c) provides an explanation for D's acts and omissions in doing or being a party to the killing.
(1A) Those things are –
(a) to understand the nature of D's conduct;
(b) to form a rational judgment;
(c) to exercise self-control.
(1B) For the purposes of subsection (1)(c), an abnormality of mental functioning provides and explanation of D's conduct if it causes, or is a significant contributory factor in causing, D to carry out that conduct.

The defence has recently been amended by s. 52 of the Coroners and Justice Act 2009, which came into force on 4 October 2010. As well, R v Golds provides a recent authority from the Court of Appeal Criminal Division on how the courts will interpret the term 'substantial' in regard to the Homicide Act 1957. At paragraph [55] of Elias LJ's judgment (following the paragraphing from the neutral citation given below) two senses of the word 'substantial' are identified: (i) something substantial is more than something which is merely trivial or minimal owing to the fact that it has "substance", or (ii) something substantial is big or large (e.g. in the sense that a substantial salary is a large one). At paragraph [72] Elias LJ concludes by opining that the court should (i) leave interpretation of the word 'substantial' to the jury, but if asked for further help should (ii) direct them under the second meaning of the term (i.e. substantial meaning big).
 1957 – In English law in R v Kemp [1957] 1 QB 399, where the defendant's arteriosclerosis led to him assaulting his wife while unconscious, it was ruled that in the insanity defense, there should be no distinction made between diseases of the mind, and diseases of the body affecting the operation of the mind, and it should be considered irrelevant whether the insanity was curable or not, or permanent or not. The jury returned a verdict of guilty but insane. 
 1959 – The  National Pension Law (Law No. 1412) was enacted in Japan, and it provided that: There is the Basic Disability Pension, which is granted after having joined the insurance program (Case A) or when a certain degree of disability has occurred prior to the age of 20 years (Case B). In the latter case; however, there is an income limitation. 1st grade – ¥981,900 (¥81,825 per month, 1997) 2nd grade – ¥785,490 (¥65,458 per month, 1997) These grades are different from the degrees indicated in the physically disabled person's handbook.
 1959 – The Mental Health Act 1959 was an act of the Parliament of the United Kingdom concerning England and Wales which had, as its main objectives, to abolish the distinction between psychiatric hospitals and other types of hospitals and to deinstituitionalise mental health patients and see them treated more by community care. It also defined the term mental disorder for the first time: "mental illness as distinct from learning disability. The definition was "mental illness; arrest or incomplete development of mind; psychopathic disorder; and any other disorder or disability of mind". At the time, 0.4% of the population of England were housed in asylums, receiving the standard treatments of the time. Their treatment was considered by the 1957 Percy Commission and the act resulted from its deliberations. The act was designed to make treatment voluntary and informal, and where compulsory give it a proper legal framework and made as a medical decision, and to move treatment, where possible, away from institutional care to that in the community. The Act repealed the Lunacy and Mental Treatment Acts 1890 to 1930 and the Mental Deficiency Acts 1913 to 1938. Another of the changes introduced by the Act was the abolishment of the category of "moral imbecile". The category, which had been introduced in 1913, had been defined in such vague terms that it had allowed also mothers of illegitimate children, especially in case of repeated births out of wedlock, to be regarded as "moral imbeciles" and thus to be placed in an institution for defectives or to be placed under guardianship.
 1959 - One of the first studies to address the issue of institutionalization directly was British psychiatrist Russell Barton's 1959 book Institutional Neurosis, which claimed that many symptoms of mental illness (specifically, psychosis) were not physical brain defects as once thought, but were consequences of institutions' "stripping" (a term probably first used in this context by Erving Goffman) away the "psychological crutches" of their patients.

1960s
 1960 – The Law for Employment Promotion, etc. of the Disabled Persons (Law No. 123) was enacted in Japan, and it provided:
(1) The Quota System: General employers including the government and municipal offices are obligated to employ disabled workers in excess of the quota. The legal quota was: Governmental bodies – 2. 0% (Non-clerical – 1. 9%) Private enterprises – 1. 6% (Specialized juridical person – 1. 9%) The quota was changed in 1998 as follows: Governmental bodies – 2. 1% (Non-clerical – 1. 9%) Private enterprises – 1. 8% (Specialized juridical person – 2. 1%) This ratio does not include mentally ill persons. Employers are obligated to report the number of disabled workers they employ to the head of the Public Employment Security Office annually. This office may announce to the public the names of enterprises who fail to meet the quota and request them to draw up plan for employment of disabled persons to meet the quota. 
(2) The Levy and Grant System: This system works by collecting levy from those enterprises that fail to achieve the quota of disabled workers. The funds created by the levy system are used to encourage employers who employ disabled persons above the quota and to promote disabled workers' employment and improve working conditions. Collection of Levies: ¥50,000 a month per person (with more than 300 full-time employees.) Payment of Adjustment Allowance: ¥25,000 per month per person will be paid to the employers who employ disabled workers more than the legal quota (with more than 300 full-time employees). Payment of Rewards: ¥17,000 per month per person will be paid to the employers who employ disabled workers in excess of the fixed number (with less than 300 full-time employees). Payment of Grants: For establishment of work facilities, special employment management, vocational adjustment, ability development, etc. to promote such employment. 
(3) Public Vocational Training Allowance for disabled persons and a loan system of funds for purchasing of technical aids and equipments.
 1960 – The Law for the Welfare of Mentally Retarded Persons (Law No. 37) was enacted in Japan, and it provided specialized counseling provided by Social Welfare Offices and Rehabilitation Consultation Centers, training for independent life, in-house services such as home helper, day care and short stay programs, etc., technical aids for daily living such as electric toothbrush and special type mat, etc., living space such as welfare homes and group homes, etc., and specialized facilities to help daily life such as residential facilities for rehabilitation, nonresidential facilities and so on.
 1960 – The Road Traffic Law (Law No. 105) was enacted in Japan, and it provided safe transportation for visually impaired persons. Thus, sighted persons are prohibited to walk with a white or yellow cane, and to walk with a guide dog.
 1960 – In English Law the concept of "irresistible impulse" was developed in the 1960 case R v. Byrne. The appellant (described as a violent sexual psychopath) strangled then mutilated a young woman; it was alleged that Byrne had violent and perverted sexual desires which he found impossible to control. Lord Parker C.J. broadened the definition of "abnormality of mind" to include those lacking "the ability to exercise will-power to control acts in accordance with [their] rational judgment". "Irresistible impulse" can be pleaded only under the defense of diminished responsibility, not under the defense of insanity. Thus it operates only as a partial defence to murder, reducing the charge to manslaughter, and giving the judge discretion as to length of sentence and whether committal would be more appropriate than incarceration.
 1961 - Enoch Powell, Minister for Health in the United Kingdom in the early 1960s, was appalled by what he witnessed on his visits to asylums, and his famous "water tower" speech in 1961 called for the closure of all National Health Service asylums and their replacement by wards in general hospitals. In that speech he said in part:

 1962 – 1979: Deep sleep therapy was practised (in combination with electroconvulsive therapy and other therapies) by Harry Bailey between 1962 and 1979 in Sydney, at the Chelmsford Private Hospital. As practised by Bailey, deep sleep therapy involved long periods of barbiturate-induced unconsciousness. It was prescribed for various conditions ranging from schizophrenia to depression to obesity, premenstrual stress syndrome and addiction. As a result, twenty-six patients died at Chelmsford Private Hospital during the 1960s and 1970s. After the failure of the agencies of medical and criminal investigation to tackle complaints about Chelmsford, a series of articles in the early 1980s in the Sydney Morning Herald and television coverage on 60 Minutes exposed the abuses at the hospital, including 24 deaths from the treatment. That forced the authorities to take action, and the Chelmsford Royal Commission was appointed. The Citizens Commission on Human Rights, a front group of the Church of Scientology, was an advocate for victims; it received documents from the hospital, copied by a nurse, "Rosa". In 1978, Sydney psychiatrist Brian Boettcher had convened a meeting of doctors working at Chelmsford and found there was little support for deep sleep therapy (Bailey did not attend). However, the treatment continued to be used into 1979.
 1964 – The Special Child Rearing Allowance Law (Law No. 134) was enacted in Japan, and it provided – Special Allowance for Disabled Persons: Provided to those 20 years of age and over with degrees of disability requiring special care and attention in daily life due to serious disability either mental or physical. ¥26,230 per month with income limitation (1997). Special Child Rearing Allowance: Granted to parents or guardians of children, under 20 years of age with moderate/severe disability.  ¥50,350 per month for those with severe disability (1997). ¥33,530 per month for those with moderate disability (1997). Welfare Allowance for Disabled Children: ¥14,270 per month is granted to children with severe disabilities.
 1964 – The Criminal Procedure (Insanity) Act 1964 was enacted. In English law, if a defendant at the time of trial claims he is insane, this hinges on whether or not he is able to understand the charge, the difference between "guilty" and "not guilty" and is able to instruct his lawyers. If he is unable to do these things, he can be found "unfit to plead" under Section 4 of the Criminal Procedure (Insanity) Act 1964. In that situation, the judge has wide discretion as to what to do with the defendant, except in cases of murder, where he must be detained in hospital.
 1965 – The Income Tax Law (Law No. 33) was enacted in Japan, and it provided that taxpayers with disability or who have a disabled family member may get exemption from income tax. The exemptions are as follows: Specified disabled persons, that is (a) Grade 1 or 2 in a physically disabled person's handbook or (b) Severe level in a handbook for people with mental retardation – ¥350,000 Disabled persons other than above – ¥270,000
 1965–1976: Aid for the Elderly in Government Institutions (AEGIS) was a British pressure group that campaigned to improve the care of older people in long-stay wards of National Health Service psychiatric hospitals. The group was founded by Barbara Robb in 1965, and was active until Robb's death in 1976.
 1966 – The Employment Countermeasures Law (Law No. 132) was enacted in Japan, and it provided measures to improve vocational training for people with disabilities and assist them to find employment, vocational training facilities and improvement of training contents, training of guidance workers and the enhancement of their quality, the supply of an allowance for adjustment training, and the supply of a training allowance to employers.
 1967 – In Great Britain under the Abortion Act 1967, abortion is permitted if there is risk to the life of the pregnant woman, a necessity for abortion to prevent grave permanent injury to the physical or mental health of the pregnant woman, risk of injury to the physical or mental health of the pregnant woman or any existing children of her family (up to a term limit of 24 weeks of gestation), or substantial risk that if the child were born, it would "suffer from such physical or mental abnormalities as to be seriously handicapped".
 1968 – After a long campaign by The Sunday Times, a compensation settlement for the UK victims of thalidomide was reached with Distillers Company (now part of Diageo), which had distributed the drug in the UK. This compensation, which is distributed by the Thalidomide Trust in the UK, was substantially increased by Diageo in 2005. The UK Government gave survivors a grant of £20 million, to be distributed through the Thalidomide Trust, in December 2009.
 1969 – The Human Resources Development Promotion Law (Law No. 64) was enacted in Japan, and it established Vocational Ability Development Centers for Disabled Persons.

1970s
 1970s – By the 1970s, numerous countries had banned the procedure of lobotomy.
 1970 – A large criminal trial regarding thalidomide was held in Germany, charging several Grünenthal officials with negligent homicide and injury. After Grünenthal settled with the victims in April 1970, the trial ended in December 1970 with no finding of guilt; however, as part of the settlement, Grünenthal paid 100 million DM into a special foundation. The German government added 320 million DM. The foundation paid victims a one-time sum of 2,500–25,000 DM (depending on severity of disability) and a monthly stipend of 100–450 DM. The monthly stipends have since been raised substantially and are now paid entirely by the government (as the foundation has run out of money). Grünenthal paid another 50 million Euros into the foundation in 2008.
 1970 – The Disabled Persons' Fundamental Law (Law No. 84; major revision in 1993) was enacted in Japan. It includes:
"Article 2 (Definition): "Disabled persons" as used in this Law means persons whose daily life or life in society is substantially limited over the long term due to a physical disability, mental retardation or mental disability. 
Article 3 (Fundamental Principles): The dignity of all disabled persons shall be respected. They shall have the right to be treated accordingly. All disabled persons shall, as members of society, be provided with opportunities to fully participate in such a manner.
Article 4 (Responsibilities of the State and Local Public Entities): The State and local public bodies shall be responsible for promoting the welfare of disabled persons and for preventing disabilities.
Article 5 (Responsibilities of the Nation): The nation shall, on the basis of the principle of social solidarity, endeavor to cooperate in promoting the welfare of disabled persons.
Article 6 (Efforts to Achieve Independence): Disabled persons shall endeavor to participate actively in social and economic activities by making effective use of the abilities they possess. The family members of disabled persons shall endeavor to promote independence of disabled persons.
Article 6-2 (Disabled Persons' Day): Disabled Persons' Day shall be established for the purpose of raising the public awareness to the welfare of disabled persons and stimulating disabled persons' desire to actively participate in social, economic, cultural and other areas of activity.
Article 7 (Fundamental Policies): The measures regarding the welfare of disabled persons shall be carried out according to their age and to the types and severity of disabilities."

There are other fundamental principles in this law regarding programs for persons with disability covering the State, Metropolitan and prefectural governments, and cities, towns and villages; as well as those regarding medicine, education, employment, pension, housing, public facilities, information, culture, sports, etc. The total number of the Articles of this law is 29.
 1970 – Disability activist Hiroshi Yokota (a member of Aoi Shiba no Kai) published the declaration of activity, "We Act Like This," in their journal Ayumi in 1970. It stated in full (with asterisks before each point replaced by dashes for clarity),

"- We identify ourselves as people with Cerebral Palsy (CP). 
We recognize our position as 'an existence which should not exist,' in the modern society. We believe that this recognition should be the starting point of our whole movement, and we act on this belief.

– We assert ourselves aggressively. 
When we identify ourselves as people with CP, we have a will to protect ourselves. We believe that a strong self-assertion is the only way to achieve self-protection, and we act on this belief.

– We deny love and justice. 
We condemn egoism held by love and justice. We believe that mutual understanding, accompanying the human observation which arises from the denial of love and justice, means the true well-being, and we act on this belief.

– We do not choose the way of problem solving. 
We have learnt from our personal experiences that easy solutions to problems lead to dangerous compromises. We believe that an endless confrontation is the only course of action possible for us, and we act on this belief." This declaration became an epoch making event in the Japanese disability movement. Later a fifth point was added, stating in full, "We deny able-bodied civilization. We recognize that modern civilization has managed to sustain itself only by excluding us, people with CP. We believe that creation of our own culture through our movement and daily life leads to the condemnation of modern civilization, and we act on this belief."
 1970 - The Chronically Sick and Disabled Persons Act 1970 is an Act of Parliament of the United Kingdom which makes provision with respect to the welfare of chronically sick and disabled persons. The Act, often shortened to ′CSDPA', was given Royal Assent on 29 May 1970.
 1972 – The Committee on Mentally Abnormal Offenders, widely referred to as the Butler Committee after its chairman Lord Butler of Saffron Walden, was set up in 1972 by the Government of the United Kingdom. The Committee submitted an Interim Report in 1974 and published a Final Report in October 1975, proposing major reforms to the law and to psychiatric services.
 1972 – ADAPT – Able Disable All People Together (formerly known as The Spastics Society of India), India's most noted non-profit and a non-governmental organization (NGO) working for neuro-muscular and developmental disabilities,  was started on 2 October 1972 by Mithu Alur, to provide education and treatment services for children with cerebral palsy. Today it has broadened its scope to include programs on teacher training and vocational training of young adults with cerebral palsy, autism, intellectual disabilities, multiple disabilities, and learning disabilities. It also works in the field of advocacy and awareness and offers support to parents and other professionals. It has led to the formation of independent Spastic societies in 16 states in India. In 1999, it established the National Resource Centre for Inclusion (NRCI), in Mumbai, to include disabled children from special schools into non-special schools. 
 1972 - Vic Finkelstein and Paul Hunt founded Union of the Physically Impaired Against Segregation (UPIAS). 
 1973 – In English law, in R v Quick and Paddison [1973] QB 910, the courts decided that an assault committed when the defendant was suffering from hypoglycemia due to the taking of insulin was not insane in nature.
 1978 – The Basaglia Law or Law 180 is the Italian Mental Health Act of 1978 which signified a large reform of the psychiatric system in Italy, contained directives for the closing down of all psychiatric hospitals and led to their gradual replacement  with a whole range of community-based services, including settings for acute in-patient care. The Basaglia Law is the basis of Italian mental health legislation. The principal proponent of Law 180 and its architect was Italian psychiatrist Franco Basaglia. Therefore, Law 180 is known as the "Basaglia Law" from the name of its promoter. The Parliament of Italy enacted Law 180 on May 13, 1978, and thereby initiated the gradual dismantling of psychiatric hospitals. Implementation of the psychiatric reform law was accomplished in 1998 which marked the very end of the state psychiatric hospital system in Italy.

1980s
 The cripple tribunal in Dortmund on 13 December 1981 was one of the main protest actions of the autonomous German disability movement (in confrontation with the established disability assistance) against human rights abuses in nursing homes and psychiatric hospitals, and as well against deficiencies of the local public-transport. Analogous to the Russell Tribunal by Amnesty International, the cripple tribunal denounced human rights violations of disabled people.
 1981 – In the British case R v Arthur a baby was born with uncomplicated Down Syndrome and was rejected by the parents. Leonard Arthur, a paediatrician, wrote in his notes that the 'Parents do not wish it to survive. Nursing care only.' The baby died 69 hours later. During the trial, the defence provided evidence that the child was not physically healthy, resulting in a reduced charge of attempted murder, for which Arthur was acquitted.
 1981 – The United Nations established this year as the International Year of Disabled Persons. At the conclusion of the year the UN called on member nations to establish in their own countries organizations for and about people with disabilities.
 1981 – Gini Laurie organized the first international conference on post-polio problems.
 1981 - The British Council of Organisations of Disabled People was founded.
 1981 – Argentina enacted "Comprehensive Protection System for the Disabled" in order to give disabled people health care, education, and social security. 
 1982 – The Social Services Act of Sweden implemented in 1982 and since changed many times covers a wide array of people in addition to persons with functional disabilities, including the elderly, children, crime victims, and people that have alcohol or drug addictions. It states that those who are under the age of 65 with a functional disability are able to request services such as a companion to help with errands, special housing options that would allow them to be cared for 24 hours a day, and home help services if they need assistance with personal care.
 1982 – The Canadian Charter of Rights and Freedoms declared physical or mental disability as a prohibited reason for discrimination; this was the first time that such a right was guaranteed in the Constitution of a country. Section 15 of the Charter makes it illegal for any governments in Canada to discriminate against persons with disabilities in their laws and programs.
 1982 - Batas Pambansa Blg. 344 of the Philippines is an act enhancing the mobility of disabled persons that requires buildings, institutions, establishments and public utilities to install some facilities and other devices. It requires the installation of sidewalks, ramps and railings for people with disabilities in public spaces. It was ratified on December 7, 1982.
 1983: The Mental Health Act 1983 (c.20) is an Act of the Parliament of the United Kingdom which applies to people in England and Wales. It covers the reception, care and treatment of mentally disordered persons, the management of their property and other related matters. In particular, it provides the legislation by which people diagnosed with a mental disorder can be detained in hospital or police custody and have their disorder assessed or treated against their wishes, unofficially known as "sectioning". Its use is reviewed and regulated by the Care Quality Commission. The Act has been significantly amended by the Mental Health Act 2007. Notably, the 1983 Act classified psychosurgery as a treatment that could only be carried out with a patient's consent. Under section 57 of the Act, which applies to both detained and informal patients, a panel of three people appointed by the Mental Health Act Commission has to establish that the patient is consenting. Then the psychiatrist on the panel authorises the operation if it is likely to alleviate or prevent deterioration in the patient's condition. The 1983 act (as amended by the 2007 act) also defines the designated relationship of nearest relative. It is the duty of the Approved mental health professional to determine who is the nearest relative of the patient and consult them in the process of assessment, treatment or guardianship. Also, Section 1 of the Mental Health (Discrimination) Act 2013 (introduced into Parliament as the Mental Health (Discrimination) (No. 2) Bill) removed from the Mental Health Act 1983 the provision that disqualifies from the House of Commons a member sectioned for over six months under that Act.
 1983 – The United Nations expanded the International Year of Disabled Persons to the International Decade of Disabled Persons (1983–1992).
 1983 – Care in the Community (also called "Community Care" or "Domiciled Care") is the British policy of deinstitutionalization, treating, and caring for physically and mentally disabled people in their homes rather than in an institution. Institutional care was the target of widespread criticism during the 1960s and 1970s, but it was not until 1983 that the government of Margaret Thatcher adopted a new policy of care after the Audit Commission published a report called 'Making a Reality of Community Care' which outlined the advantages of domiciled care.
 1984 – In English law, in R v Sullivan, a man was charged with grievous bodily harm under the Offences against the Person Act 1861 after assaulting his friend during an epileptic seizure. The House of Lords ruled that Sullivan was indeed insane, and that "it does not lie within the power of the courts to alter [the insanity test]".
 1984 – The Telecommunication Service Law (Law No. 86) was enacted in Japan, and it provided that disabled persons may get NTT telephone directory service for a free of charge, and persons with speech disorder may get lower fee of usage fee of public telephone through calling by credit.
 1984 – The Mental Health (Scotland) Act 1984 was enacted. One of the main purposes of the Mental Health (Public Safety and Appeals) (Scotland) Act 1999 is to introduce a right of appeal against a decision, notification or recommendation of a sheriff in relation to an appeal brought by a restricted patient in terms of Part VI of the Mental Health (Scotland) Act 1984. The right of appeal against the sheriff's decision, notification or recommendation is conferred on both the patient and the Scottish Ministers. The appeal is to the Court of Session. The 1984 act was subsequently largely replaced by the Mental Health (Care and Treatment) (Scotland) Act 2003.
 1985 – The International Polio Network was founded by Gini Laurie, and began advocating for recognition of post-polio syndrome.
 1985 – The Canadian Human Rights Act was enacted, and it banned discrimination against people due to their physical or mental disability. Furthermore, the Act requires federally regulated employers to prevent discrimination and to provide access and support to individuals with disabilities.
 1986 – Justice Frank Vincent of the Supreme Court of Victoria in Australia ordered a hospital to take "all necessary means" to save a nine-day-old baby boy with spina bifida, rejecting the hospital's view that only "ordinary treatment" should be given. During the case, Justice Vincent ruled that nobody "has any power to determine that the life of any child, however disabled that child may be, will be deliberately taken away from it .... [The law] does not permit any decisions to be made concerning the quality of life, nor does it enable ... any assessment to be made as to the value of any human being." In that case, the grandparents had sought legal means to keep the baby alive, and Justice Vincent made the baby a ward of the court. However, the doctors and hospital did not present their side to the court or provide evidence to explain their recommendation.
 1986 – E (Mrs) v Eve, [1986] 2 S.C.R. 388 is a judgment by the Supreme Court of Canada regarding a mother's request for the consent of the court to have her disabled daughter sterilized.  This was a landmark case which is influential in Canadian legal decisions involving proxy-consented, non-therapeutic medical procedures performed on people of diminished mental capacity. Eve was a 24-year-old woman with "extreme expressive aphasia" and was at least "mildly to moderately retarded" with learning skills at a limited level. The Supreme Court of Canada ruled in favour of Eve, and unanimously rejected Mrs. E.'s request for authorization to perform a sterilization procedure. The opinion of the Supreme Court of Canada was that "barring emergency situations, a surgical procedure without consent ordinarily constitutes battery, [and] it will be obvious that the onus of proving the need for the procedure is on those who seek to have it performed...In conducting these procedures, it is obvious that a court must proceed with extreme caution; otherwise...it would open the way for abuse of the mentally incompetent, ...[so the court] would allow the appeal and restore the decision" of the original court, which had rejected the petition. 
 1987 – Gini Laurie founded the International Ventilator Users Network (IVUN).
 1988 – The Consumption Tax Law (Law No. 108) was enacted in Japan, and it provided that items for disabled persons (e. g. prosthesis, cane, artificial eyes, Braille writer and wheelchair) are exempted from consumption tax.
 1989 – In English law, in R v Hennsey [1989] 1 WLR 287 it was held that a crime committed while the defendant was suffering from hyperglycemia did constitute insanity.
 1989 - This year over 80 disabled persons and supporters coming from the Independent Living movement gathered in Strasbourg, France for a conference on personal assistance. The conference was funded by the German Green party and was an opportunity for members of the Independent Living movement to meet. This meeting resulted in the founding of ENIL – The European Network on Independent Living (ENIL). 
 1989 - The British Council of Organisations of Disabled People started the National Centre for Independent Living (NCIL, 1989–2011) as a project, which became a spin-out independent organization in the early 2000s before merging with two other organizations to form Disability Rights UK in January 2012.
 1989 - Republic Act 6759 of the Philippines, also known as the White Cane Act, declares August 1 of every year as White Cane Safety Day in recognition of the visually impaired people with disabilities' need for assistance and as a reminder for the public of their duty to care for and respect them. The act was ratified on September 18, 1989.

1990s
 1990 – China enacted the Law of the People's Republic of China on the Protection of Disabled Persons, which (among other provisions) declared that China must "provide disabled persons with special assistance by adopting supplementary methods and supportive measures with a view to alleviating or eliminating the effects of their disabilities and external barriers and ensuring the realization of their rights...provide special assurance, treatment and pension to wounded or disabled servicemen and persons disabled while on duty or for protecting the interests of the State and people...guarantee the right of disabled persons to education...[and] guarantee disabled persons' right to work," as well as banning discrimination against people with disabilities in employment, engagement, status regularization, promotion, determining technical or professional titles, payment for labor, welfare, labor insurance or in other aspects.
 1990 – MindFreedom International is an international coalition of over one hundred grassroots groups and thousands of individual members from fourteen nations, based in America and founded in 1990. It was created to advocate against forced medication, medical restraints, and involuntary electroconvulsive therapy. Its stated mission is to protect the rights of people who have been labeled with psychiatric disorders. 
 1991 – Care Programme Approach (CPA) in the United Kingdom is a system of delivering community mental health services to individuals diagnosed with a mental illness. It was introduced in England in 1991 and by 1996 became a key component of the mental health system in England. The approach requires that health and social services assess need, provided a written care plan, allocate a care coordinator, and then regularly review the plan with key stakeholders, in keeping with the National Health Service and Community Care Act 1990.
 1991 – Baby M (14 July 1989 – 26 July 1989) was the pseudonym of an Australian girl named Allison who was born with severe birth defects, whose treatment and eventual death caused significant controversy and international discussion about the medical ethics of disabled newborns. Right to Life activists accused her parents and the hospital of murdering the infant, leading to a lengthy legal inquest. In 1991, a hearing into the Baby M case lasted five months. The Deputy Coroner Wendy Wilmoth ruled that Allison had died of natural causes, and chastised the Right to Life group. "The decisions made by her doctors and her parents, and the careful steps taken to ensure these decisions were legally, ethically and morally sound, have been tested and found entirely reasonable and appropriate," Wilmoth stated. The child's parents and the medical staff were exonerated of all wrongdoing.
 1991 – R v Burgess [1991] 2 QB 92 is a decision of the Court of Appeal of England and Wales that found sleepwalking as insane automatism. In a previous decision, Burgess was found not guilty by reason of insanity because his case fell under the M'Naghten Rules. Burgess appealed his previous verdict on the grounds he was not guilty due to automatism because he did not have the mens rea to make him guilty. However, the court ruled that sleepwalking was considered insane automatism and Burgess' appeal was denied.
 1992 – The Disability Discrimination Act 1992 became law in Australia, and it banned discrimination against people with disabilities in employment, education, access to premises, accommodation, buying or selling land, activities of clubs, sport, administration of Commonwealth laws and programs, provision of goods, and services and facilities.
 1992 – Secretary of the Department of Health and Community Services v JWB and SMB (Marion's case), is one of the primary cases under Australian law for deciding whether a child has the capacity to make decisions for themselves, and when this is not possible, who may make decisions for them regarding major medical procedures. It largely adopts the views in Gillick v West Norfolk Area Health Authority, a decision of the English House of Lords. It was regarding "Marion", a pseudonym for the 14-year-old girl at the centre of this case, who had intellectual disabilities, severe deafness, epilepsy and other disorders. Her parents, a married couple from the Northern Territory sought an order from the Family Court of Australia authorising them to have Marion undergo a hysterectomy and an oophrectomy (removal of ovaries). The practical effect would be sterilisation and preventing Marion from being able to have children and many of the hormonal effects of adulthood. The High Court of Australia recognised the right of everyone to bodily integrity under national and international law, and made a distinction between therapeutic and non-therapeutic surgical procedures as well as the duty of surrogates to act in the best interests of the incompetent patient. In the case, the High Court ruled that while parents may consent to medical treatment for their children, the authority does not extend to treatment not in the child's best interests. Also, the Court held that if medical treatment has sterilisation as its principal objective, parents do not have the authority to consent on behalf of their child.
 1992 – The Disabled Persons Act, Act Number 5 of 1992 was adopted by Zimbabwe. This Act provides for the welfare and rehabilitation of disabled persons, the appointment and functions of a Director for Disabled Persons' Affairs, and the establishment and functions of a National Disability Board. Discrimination against disabled persons in employment, and denial to disabled persons of access to public premises, services and amenities are prohibited.
 1992 - The Republic Act No. 727 of the Philippines is "an act providing for the rehabilitation, self-development and self-reliance of disabled persons and their integration into the mainstream of society and for other purposes." It outlines the rights and privileges of disabled persons and the prohibition on discrimination against them. It was ratified on March 24, 1992.
 1993 – Poland banned abortion except in cases of severe congenital disorders, rape, incest, or threat to the life of the pregnant woman.
 1993 - Barbara Turnbull made a complaint with the Ontario Human Rights Commission over lack of accessibility in cinemas operated by Famous Players Theatres; in 2001 the commission ruled in her favor, however two cinemas were closed instead of made fully accessible.
 1993 – Tony Bland was a supporter of Liverpool F.C. injured in the Hillsborough disaster. He experienced severe brain damage that left him in a persistent vegetative state as a consequence of which the hospital, with the support of his parents, applied for a court order allowing him to 'die with dignity'. As a result, in 1993 he became the first patient in English legal history to be allowed to die by the courts through the withdrawal of life-prolonging treatment including food and water.
 1993 – Sue Rodriguez, who lived in Victoria, British Columbia, was diagnosed with amyotrophic lateral sclerosis (ALS) in early 1991. She fought to have a legal right to assisted suicide; under the Criminal Code, assisted suicide is punishable by a maximum sentence of 14 years in prison. She took her cause to the Supreme Court of Canada, but ultimately lost the battle. On September 30, 1993, in what would become a landmark decision, Rodriguez v. British Columbia (Attorney General), the SCC held 5–4 against her.
 1993 – The Law for Promoting Businesses that Facilitate the Use of Communications and Broadcast Services by the Physically Disabled Persons (Law No. 54) was enacted in Japan, and it promoted services to make media like telecommunications and broadcast accessible to people with disabilities. For instance, it provided subsidies for the production of superimposed television programs or those with narrations explaining the action.
 1993 – New Zealand passed the Human Rights Act 1993, which prohibits discrimination on the basis of physical, intellectual and psychiatric disabilities, except in cases of insurance policies. HIV status is also included within the legislation. Discrimination is banned within accommodation, employment and goods and service provision. 
 1993 - In early 1993, Barbara Lisicki, Alan Holdsworth, and Sue Elsegood became founders of the Disabled People's Direct Action Network (DAN).
 1993 – Mad Pride is a mass movement of the users of mental health services, former users, and the aligned, which advocates that individuals with mental illness should be proud of their 'mad' identity. It was formed in 1993 in response to local community prejudices towards people with a psychiatric history living in boarding homes in the Parkdale area of Toronto, Ontario, Canada, and an event has been held every year since then in the city except for 1996.
 1994 – The Law for Buildings Accessible to and Usable by the Elderly and Physically Disabled Persons (Law No. 44) was enacted in Japan. It aims to build public buildings which meet the needs of people with disabilities. It is also called the "Heartful Building Law."
Schools, hospitals, theatres, arenas, community centre, exhibition halls, department stores, hotels, office, multidwelling units or senior homes with floor space less than  must spend reasonable effort to install and maintain tactile pavings inside the building, but not required. The original law was replaced by another law in 2006 with wider scope including outdoor areas.
 1994 – Since 1994, New Zealand has protected the rights of disabled people under the Health and Disability Commissioner Act, including rights to respect, freedom from discrimination and coercion, dignity, communication in a language the resident can understand, information and informed consent, and right of complaint.
 1994–1998: Study 329 was a clinical trial conducted in North America from 1994 to 1998 to study the efficacy of paroxetine, an SSRI anti-depressant, in treating 12- to 18-year-olds diagnosed with major depressive disorder. Led by Martin Keller, then professor of psychiatry at Brown University, and funded by the British pharmaceutical company SmithKline Beecham—known since 2000 as GlaxoSmithKline (GSK)—the study compared paroxetine with imipramine, a tricyclic antidepressant, and placebo (an inert pill). SmithKline Beecham had released paroxetine in 1991, marketing it as Paxil in North America and Seroxat in the UK. The drug attracted sales of $11.7 billion in the United States alone from 1997 to 2006, including $2.12 billion in 2002, the year before it lost its patent. Published in July 2001 in the Journal of the American Academy of Child and Adolescent Psychiatry (JAACAP), which listed Keller and 21 other researchers as co-authors, study 329 became controversial when it was discovered that the article had been ghostwritten by a PR firm hired by SmithKline Beecham; had made inappropriate claims about the drug's efficacy; and had downplayed safety concerns. The controversy led to several lawsuits and strengthened calls for drug companies to disclose all their clinical research data.
 1995 – In 1995 Leilani Muir sued the Province of Alberta for forcing her to be sterilized against her will and without her permission under the Sexual Sterilization Act of Alberta in 1959, when she was institutionalized at the Provincial Training School for Mental Defectives. Since Muir's case, the Alberta government has apologized for the forced sterilization of over 2,800 people under the Act. Nearly 850 Albertans who were sterilized under the Sexual Sterilization Act were awarded C$142 million in damages.
 1995 – The Disability Discrimination Act 1995 (DDA 1995) became law in the United Kingdom. This made it unlawful in the United Kingdom to discriminate against people with disabilities in relation to employment, the provision of goods and services, education, and transport. The Equality and Human Rights Commission provides support for this Act. Equivalent legislation exists in Northern Ireland, which is enforced by the Northern Ireland Equality Commission. 
 1995 - The Persons With Disabilities (Equal Opportunities, Protection of Rights and Full Participation) Act, 1995 was enacted in India. 
 1996 – The Eugenic Protection Law in Japan was replaced by the Maternity Protection Law, which eliminated the provision based on eugenics.
 1997 –  In DPP v Harper [1997], it was decided that the insanity defence could also be applied in a magistrates' court in England and Wales.
 1997 – In Eldridge v. British Columbia (Attorney General) [1997] 2 S.C.R. 624, the Supreme Court of Canada ruled that sign language interpreters must be provided in the delivery of medical services where doing so is necessary to ensure effective communication.
 1998 – In R v Bournewood Community and Mental Health NHS Trust the House of Lords ruled that a man who had been informally admitted to a psychiatric hospital without capable consent had not been unlawfully detained under the common law.  A later European Court of Human Rights ruling, however, found that the man had been unlawfully deprived of his liberty in the meaning of Article 5 of the European Convention on Human Rights.
 1999 – The Disability Rights Commission Act 1999 abolished the National Disability Council and replaced it with a Disability Rights Commission. Like the council, the Commission covered England, Scotland and Wales. However unlike the Council it also had power to support individuals seeking to enforce their rights (Disability Rights Commission Act 1999 s.7) and powers of investigation (Disability Rights Commission Act 1999 s.3).
 1999 – The Mental Health (Public Safety and Appeals) (Scotland) Act 1999 was an Act of the Scottish Parliament which was passed by the Parliament in September 1999 and was designed to close a loophole in the law which led to the release of mentally ill killer, Noel Ruddle, who was released from the state hospital at Carstairs after arguing its treatment programmes were no longer of benefit to him. The Act had two main purposes: The first was to add a new criterion to the statutory tests applied by a sheriff or the Scottish Ministers when considering whether to order the discharge of a restricted patient. The sheriff and the Scottish Ministers must now refuse to order a discharge (either conditional or absolute) if satisfied that the patient has a mental disorder, the effect of which is that continuing detention in hospital is necessary to protect the public from serious harm. That is so whether or not the patient is to receive medical treatment for the mental disorder. The second is to introduce a right of appeal against a decision, notification or recommendation of a sheriff in relation to an appeal brought by a restricted patient in terms of Part VI of the Mental Health (Scotland) Act 1984. The right of appeal against the sheriff's decision, notification or recommendation is conferred on both the patient and the Scottish Ministers. The appeal is to the Court of Session. The Act also widens the term 'mental disorder', which appears in earlier legislation, to include a personality disorder.
 1999 – ADAPT – Able Disable All People Together established the National Resource Centre for Inclusion (NRCI), in Mumbai, to include disabled children from special schools into non-special schools.

2000s
 2000 – The Psychiatric Patient Built Wall Tours take place in Toronto, ON at the CAMH facility on Queen St West. The tours show the patient built walls from the 19th century that are located at present day CAMH. The purpose of the tours is to give a history on the lives of the patients who built the walls, and bring attention to the harsh realities of psychiatry. Geoffrey Reaume and Heinz Klein first came up with the idea of walking tours as part of a Mad Pride event in 2000. The first wall tour occurred on what is now known as Mad Pride Day, on July 14, 2000, with an attendance of about fifty people. Reaume solely leads the tours, and they have grown from annual events for Mad Pride, to occurring several times throughout the year in all non-winter months.
 2000 – The Adults with Incapacity (Scotland) Act 2000 (2000 asp 4) is an Act of the Scottish Parliament. It was passed on 29 March 2000, receiving royal assent on 9 May. It concerns the welfare of adults (the age of legal capacity in Scotland being 16) who are unable to make decisions for themselves because they have a mental disorder or are not able to communicate. It provides the framework for other people (such as carers) to act on the behalf of people with incapacity.
 2001 – In R. v. Latimer [2001] 1 S.C.R. 3, the Supreme Court of Canada ruled that Robert Latimer's crime of murdering his disabled daughter Tracy Latimer could not be justified through the defence of necessity. Furthermore, the Supreme Court of Canada found that despite the special circumstances of the case, the lengthy prison sentence given to Mr. Latimer was not cruel and unusual, and therefore not a breach of section 12 of the Canadian Charter of Rights and Freedoms.
 2001 – Re A (conjoined twins) [2001] 2 WLR 480 is a Court of Appeal of England and Wales decision on the separation of conjoined twins. Gracie and Rosie Attard, who were born on 8 August 2000, were conjoined twins who were joined at the abdomen. The medical evidence indicated that Gracie was the stronger sibling who was sustaining the life of Rosie. Rosie had only survived birth due to a shared common artery that enabled her sister Gracie to oxygenate blood for both twins. If surgically separated, Gracie had a 94% survival rate, but Rosie was guaranteed to die. However, if they were left conjoined, then Gracie's health—which was already rapidly deteriorating—was predicted to fail before they were six months old. Gracie's death would inevitably result in Rosie's. At first instance, Mr Justice Johnson was left to decide the case without any direct precedents to guide him but reasoned by analogy with Airedale NHS Trust v Bland where it was declared acceptable to remove life support. Johnson ruled that separation would not be murder but a case of "passive euthanasia" in which food and hydration would be withdrawn. The Court of Appeal rejected this analysis but the three judges who presided over the case gave very different legal reasoning. Lord Justice Alan Ward invoked the concept of self-defence suggesting that "If [Gracie] could speak she would surely protest, Stop it, [Rosie], you're killing me." Lord Justice Brooke relied upon R v Dudley and Stephens and invoked necessity as a defence. Lord Justice Robert Walker focused upon the intention of the surgeons in concluding that surgery could go ahead. The 20-hour-long operation to separate the twins took place on 7 November 2000. As expected, Gracie survived the operation and Rosie died. Rosie's remains were later buried on the Maltese island of Gozo.
 2002 - In Japan, the Act on Assistance Dogs for Physically Disabled Persons was issued in 2002. The stated goal of this act was to improve the quality of "assistance dogs for physically disabled persons" and expand the use of public facilities by physically disabled people. Assistance dogs are classified as either guide dogs, hearing dogs, or service dogs. Public transportation, public facilities, offices of public organization, and private businesses of 50 or more people are required to accept assistance dogs. Private housing and private businesses with less than 50 people are encouraged but not required to accept assistance dogs.
 2003 - In the United Kingdom, disability hate crime is regarded as an aggravating factor under Section 146 of the Criminal Justice Act 2003, allowing a heavier tariff to be used in sentencing than the crime might draw without the hate elements. Section 146 states that the sentencing provisions apply if:
(a) that, at the time of committing the offence, or immediately before or after doing so, the offender demonstrated towards the victim of the offence hostility based on—
(i) the sexual orientation (or presumed sexual orientation) of the victim, or
(ii) a disability (or presumed disability) of the victim, or
(b) that the offence is motivated (wholly or partly)—
(i) by hostility towards persons who are of a particular sexual orientation, or
(ii) by hostility towards persons who have a disability or a particular disability.
 2003 – The Forensic Network (the shortened name of the Forensic Mental Health Services Managed Care Network) is one of Scotland's Managed Clinical Networks and it was established in Scotland in September 2003 by Scottish Government, in conjunction with "The Mental Health (Care and Treatment) (Scotland) Act 2003", and following a review of the State Hospital's Board for Scotland, 'The Right Place - The Right Time'.
 2003 – In Starson v. Swayze, 2003 SCC 32, [2003] 1 S.C.R. 722, the Supreme Court of Canada ruled that Mr. Starson had the right to refuse psychiatric medication because the Consent and Capacity board did not have enough evidence to support its finding that Mr. Starson was incapable of deciding on treatment.
 2003 – On March 18, 2003, the UK government formally recognized that British Sign Language was a language in its own right.
 2003 – The Mental Health (Care and Treatment) (Scotland) Act 2003, which came into effect on 5 October 2005, is an Act of the Scottish Parliament which enables medical professionals to detain and treat people against their will on grounds of mental disorder, with the Mental Health Tribunal for Scotland and the Mental Welfare Commission for Scotland providing safeguards against mistreatment. It largely replaces the Mental Health (Scotland) Act 1984. Two particularly notable features of the 2003 act are as follows: Under section 234 of the Mental Health (Care and Treatment) (Scotland) Act 2003, psychosurgery can only be carried out on consenting patients if a panel from the Mental Welfare Commission confirms that the patient's consent is valid and that the operation is in their best interests. It may also be carried out on incapable patients, as long as they are not objecting, with Court of Session approval, but since the law came into force, no non-consenting patients have undergone psychosurgery. Secondly, in Scotland the Mental Health (Care and Treatment) (Scotland) Act 2003 gives patients with capacity the right to refuse ECT.
 2004 - The police, fire service, and prison service were included in disability anti-discrimination laws in the United Kingdom from October 2004.
 2004 – In Camden, a beggar with a wound on his neck was charged with an Anti-Social Behavior Order. This barred him from re-entering the town.
 2004 – In the case HL v UK (45508/99) the European Court of Human Rights found that the informal admission to a psychiatric hospital of a compliant but incapacitated adult was in contravention of Article 5 of the European Convention on Human Rights. The court found that the distinction between actual and potential detention relied upon by the UK House of Lords in their ruling that HL had not been detained in R v Bournewood Community and Mental Health NHS Trust was not of central importance under Article 5.  The European Court also held that the practice of informal admission of compliant but incapacitated adults who were de facto detained was not 'in accordance with a procedure described by law' and thus was not lawful under the convention. The case resulted in major changes to the admission procedures for incapacitated adults to care homes and hospitals in the UK where they are, or may be, deprived of their liberty (see Deprivation of Liberty Safeguards).
 2005 – The Accessibility for Ontarians with Disabilities Act, 2005 is a statute enacted in 2005 for the purpose of improving accessibility standards for Ontarians with physical and mental disabilities to all public establishments by 2025. Some employers began taking steps to bring their organizations into compliance in 2005.
 2005 – New Zealand established a reconciliation initiative in 2005 to address the ongoing compensation payouts to ex-patients of state-run mental institutions in the 1970s to 1990s. A number of grievances were heard, including: poor reasons for admissions; unsanitary and overcrowded conditions; lack of communication to patients and family members; physical violence and sexual misconduct and abuse; inadequate mechanisms for dealing with complaints; pressures and difficulties for staff, within an authoritarian hierarchy based on containment; fear and humiliation in the misuse of seclusion; over-use and abuse of ECT, psychiatric medications, and other treatments as punishments, including group therapy, with continued adverse effects; lack of support on discharge; interrupted lives and lost potential; and continued stigma, prejudice, and emotional distress and trauma. There were some references to instances of helpful aspects or kindnesses despite the system. Participants were offered counselling to help them deal with their experiences, along with advice on their rights, including access to records and legal redress.
 2005 – The Mental Capacity Act 2005 (c 9) is an Act of the Parliament of the United Kingdom applying to England and Wales. Its primary purpose is to provide a legal framework for acting and making decisions on behalf of adults who lack the capacity to make particular decisions for themselves. It was amended by the Mental Health Act 2007.
 2005 – The Dutch Supreme Court fully upheld a wrongful life claim in the Netherlands' first wrongful life case ever. Wrongful life is the name given to a legal action in which someone is sued by a severely disabled child (through the child's legal guardian) for failing to prevent the child's birth.
 2005 – Joanna Jepson instigated a legal challenge to the late abortion of a 28-week-old foetus in the United Kingdom in 2001. The reasons given for the termination were associated with the fetus having a cleft lip and palate – grounds which Jepson argued did not constitute "a serious handicap" under the terms of the 1967 UK Abortion Act. Jepson, who was born with a jaw deformity herself, and whose brother was disabled, argued that the abortion was an "unlawful killing". However, in 2005 a judicial review concluded that the doctors carrying out the abortion had "acted in good faith", and would not face prosecution.
 2006 – World Down Syndrome Day (WDSD) is marked each year on March 21, beginning in 2006. The 21st day of March (the 3rd month of the year) was selected to signify the uniqueness of the triplication (trisomy) of the 21st chromosome which causes Down syndrome.
 2006 – In the United Kingdom, the Fixated Threat Assessment Centre (FTAC) is a joint police/mental health unit set up in October 2006 by the Home Office, the Department of Health and Metropolitan Police Service to assess and manage the risk  to politicians, members of the British Royal Family, and other public figures from obsessive individuals.
 2006 – The Disability Discrimination (Northern Ireland) Order 2006 strengthened and extended the coverage of the Disability Discrimination Act 1995, increasing the scope of legislation to include more people with disabilities, such as people diagnosed with cancer, HIV, and multiple sclerosis (MS), but not yet showing signs of their illness. Also, people with mental ill health no longer had to prove their condition was "clinically well-recognised". The new laws also provided extra protection for disabled people in other areas such as private clubs and in discriminatory job advertisements, and provided that all trains will have to be fully accessible to those with disabilities by 2020.
 2006 – The Convention on the Rights of Persons with Disabilities (CRPD) was adopted by the United Nations in 2006.
 2006 – The Equality Act 2006 was passed in the United Kingdom. The 2006 Act is a precursor to the Equality Act 2010, which combines all of the equality enactments within Great Britain and provides comparable protections across all equality strands. Those explicitly mentioned by the Equality Act 2006 include age; disability; gender; proposed, commenced or completed gender reassignment; race; religion or belief and sexual orientation. The changes it made included creating the Equality and Human Rights Commission (EHRC), merging the Commission for Racial Equality, the Equal Opportunities Commission and the Disability Rights Commission.
 2006 – Piergiorgio Welby was an Italian poet, painter and activist whose three-month-long battle to establish his right to die led to a debate about euthanasia in his country. Welby was diagnosed with muscular dystrophy as a teenager in the early 1960s. The disease progressed, and in 1997 he became unable to breathe on his own. He became politically active in the right-to-die movement, and in 2006 he publicly declared his wish to refuse the medical treatment that kept him alive. The case was controversial, with liberal politicians supporting him and conservatives and the Vatican speaking out against his cause. After three months, he was allowed to die, though he was denied a church burial.
 2006 – The high court in Lausanne, Switzerland, in a 2006 ruling, granted an anonymous individual with longstanding psychiatric difficulties the right to end his own life.
 2006 - In Brazil, a 2006 federal decree requires allowance of guide dogs in all public and open to public places.
 2007 – Giovanni Nuvoli was an Italian former football referee who had hadamyotrophic lateral sclerosis since 2001. With the help of Associazione Luca Coscioni, he fought for his right to die but his attempted euthanasia was blocked by the authorities on February 13, 2007. He started a hunger strike on July 16, 2007, and he subsequently died on July 23.
 2007 – The Mental Health Act 2007 (c 12) is an Act of the Parliament of the United Kingdom. It amends the Mental Health Act 1983 and the Mental Capacity Act 2005. It applies to people in England and Wales. Most of the Act was implemented on 3 November 2008.

It introduces significant changes which include:

1. Introduction of Supervised Community Treatment, including Community Treatment Orders (CTOs). This new power replaces supervised discharge with a power to return the patient to hospital, where the person may be forcibly medicated, if the medication regime is not being complied with in the community. 
2. Redefining professional roles: broadening the range of mental health professionals who can be responsible for the treatment of patients without their consent.
3. Creating the role of approved clinician, which is a registered healthcare professional (social worker, nurse, psychologist or occupational therapist) approved by the appropriate authority to act for purposes of the Mental Health Act 1983 (as amended).
4. Replacing the role of approved social worker by the role of approved mental health professional; the person fulfilling this role need not be a social worker.
5. Nearest relative: making it possible for some patients to appoint a civil partner as nearest relative.
6. Definition of mental disorder: introduce a new definition of mental disorder throughout the Act, abolishing previous categories
7. Criteria for Involuntary commitment: introduce a requirement that someone cannot be detained for treatment unless appropriate treatment is available and removes the treatability test.
8. Mental Health Review Tribunal (MHRT): improve patient safeguards by taking an order-making power which will allow the current time limit to be varied and for automatic referral by hospital managers to the MHRT.
9. Introduction of independent mental health advocates (IMHAs) for 'qualifying patients'.
10. Electroconvulsive Therapy may not be given to a patient who has capacity to refuse consent to it, and may only be given to an incapacitated patient where it does not conflict with any advance directive, decision of a donee or deputy or decision of the Court of Protection.
 2008 – The whole mental health tribunal system in England changed in 2008. As a result, in England, the Mental Health Review Tribunal as a standalone process was technically abolished and became one part of a Health and Social Care Chamber of a newly established national level of hearings called the First-tier Tribunal. It is now technically known as the First-tier Tribunal (Mental Health), but in practice is often called the Mental Health Tribunal. A new Upper Tribunal was also created, which hears appeals against decisions by the First-tier. In Wales, the tribunal is still the Mental Health Review Tribunal for Wales.
 2008–2010: In 2008, the Perm Krai ombudswoman Tatyana Margolina reported that 14 women with disabilities were subjected to compulsory medical sterilization in the Ozyorskiy psychoneurological nursing home whose director was Grigory Bannikov. The sterilizations were performed not on the basis of a mandatory court decision appropriate for them, but only on the basis of the application by the guardian Bannikov. On 2 December 2010, however, the court did not find corpus delicti in the compulsory medical sterilizations performed by his consent.
 2009 – Until 2009 in England and Wales, the Mental Health Act 1983 allowed the use of ECT on detained patients whether or not they had capacity to consent to it. However, following amendments which took effect in 2009, ECT may not generally be given to a patient who has capacity and refuses it, irrespective of his or her detention under the Act. However, there is an exception regardless of consent and capacity; under Section 62 of the Act, if the treating psychiatrist says the need for treatment is urgent they may start a course of ECT without authorization.
 2009 – Eluana Englaro (25 November 1970 – 9 February 2009) was an Italian woman from Lecco, who entered a persistent vegetative state on 18 January 1992, following a car accident, and subsequently became the focus of a court battle between supporters and opponents of euthanasia. Shortly after her accident, medical staff began feeding Englaro with a feeding tube, but her father "fought to have her feeding tube removed, saying it would be a dignified end to his daughter's life. He said that before the crash his daughter visited a friend who was in a coma and told him she didn't want the same thing to happen to her if she were ever in the same state." The authorities refused his request, but the decision was finally reversed in 2009, after she had spent seventeen years in the persistent vegetative state.
 2009: Debbie Purdy was a British music journalist and political activist from Bradford, West Yorkshire,  with primary progressive multiple sclerosis, notable for her challenge to the law in England and Wales as relates to assisted suicide. On 20 September 2009, it was announced that guidelines on assisted suicide law would be published by the UK Government. The guidelines for England and Wales "come after a legal battle won by Debbie Purdy", as "Law Lords accepted earlier this year that [Purdy] had a right to know whether her husband would be prosecuted if he helped her to travel abroad to commit suicide."
 2009 - International Week of the Deaf (IWDeaf) is celebrated annually across the world during the last full week of September since 2009.

2010s
 2010 - On 20 May 2010, the European Court of Human Rights (ECtHR) ruled in Alajos Kiss v. Hungary (38832/06) that Hungary cannot restrict voting rights only on the basis of guardianship due to a psychosocial disability. The ECtHR awarded Mr. Kiss with EUR 3,000.
 2010 - In July 2010 in Vancouver, Canada, the board of the 21st International Congress on the Education of the Deaf (ICED) formally voted to reject all of the 1880 Milan resolutions.
 2010 – The Mental Health (Wales) Measure 2010 is a piece of legislation introduced to Wales by Health Minister Edwina Hart for both Health and Social Services. The measure was passed by the National Assembly for Wales on 2 November 2010.
 2010 – In the United Kingdom, an unofficial Disability History Month is observed by participating individuals and organizations. It was first marked in 2010 and annually scheduled to run from November 22 to December 22.
 2010 – The Disability Discrimination (Transport Vehicles) Regulations (Northern Ireland) 2009 came into operation on 25 January 2010. These regulations lift the exemption which applied to transport providers from Part 3 of the DDA. This means that from 25 January 2010 transport providers must not discriminate against disabled people when providing goods, facilities, and services.
 2010 – The Equality Act 2010 was passed in the United Kingdom. The primary purpose of the act is to consolidate the complicated and numerous array of acts and regulations which formed the basis of anti-discrimination law in Great Britain.
 2011 – The Joseph Maraachli case refers to an international controversy over the life of Joseph Maraachli, commonly known as Baby Joseph, a Canadian infant who was diagnosed with a rare progressive and incurable neurological disorder called Leigh's disease. A hearing before the Consent and Capacity Board of Ontario in regard to him took place in January 2011. On January 22, the Board released its decision, holding that the course of action in the child's "best interests" would be "removal of the endotracheal tube without replacement, a Do Not Resuscitate order and palliative care." The parents were ordered to consent to the removal of the breathing tube. They decided to appeal the Board's decision in the Ontario Superior Court of Justice. Still in 2011, an hour after the lawyers delivered their arguments, Justice Helen Rady returned with her decision, upholding the Board's decision as "reasonable" and dismissing the family's appeal. The family was ordered to give consent for the breathing tube's removal by February 21, 2011. The family refused to consent to the breathing tube's removal, and thus it was not removed on February 21. Joseph's parents fought to have him transferred to the United States, arguing that while Joseph's disease was terminal, a tracheotomy would extend his life and allow him to die at home. After several months and efforts by American pro-life groups, Joseph was transferred to a Catholic hospital in St. Louis, Missouri, where the procedure was performed in 2011. The successfully-obtained procedure extended Joseph's life for several months. Joseph died in 2011, at his home.
 2011 – Aruna Shanbaug (1 June 1948 – 18 May 2015), alternatively spelled Shanbhag, was an Indian nurse who was at the centre of attention in a court case on euthanasia after spending 42 years in a vegetative state as a result of sexual assault. In 1973, while working as a junior nurse at King Edward Memorial Hospital, Parel, Mumbai, Shanbaug was sexually assaulted by a ward boy, Sohanlal Bhartha Walmiki, and remained in a vegetative state following the assault. On 24 January 2011, after she had been in this state for 37 years, the Supreme Court of India responded to the plea for euthanasia filed by journalist Pinki Virani, by setting up a medical panel to examine her. The court rejected the petition on 7 March 2011. However, in its landmark opinion, it allowed passive euthanasia in India.
 2011 – AH v West London Mental Health Trust was a landmark case in England, which established a legal precedent in 2011 when Albert Laszlo Haines (AH), a patient in Broadmoor Hospital, a high security psychiatric hospital, was able to exercise a right to a fully open and public mental health review tribunal to hear his appeal for release. The case and the legal principles it affirmed have been described as opening up the secret world of tribunals and National Health Service secure units, and as having substantial ramifications for mental health professionals and solicitors, though how frequently patients will be willing or able to exercise the right is not yet clear. The detention of Haines under the Mental Health Act had been continuous since 1986, mainly at Broadmoor Hospital run by West London Mental Health NHS Trust. The tribunal panel ultimately decided there were sufficient grounds for continued psychiatric detention but recommended better collaborative work towards psychiatric rehabilitation and gradual supported pathways to lower security then release to community mental health services.
 2011 - The Korean National Assembly passed the "Dogani Law" (named after the Korean name of the film Silenced), removing any statute of limitations for sexual assault against children under 13 and disabled people. It also raised the maximum sentence for rape of young children and disabled people to up to life in prison, and abolished a clause requiring that victims prove they were "unable to resist" due to their disability.
 2012 – The Supreme Court of India declared that a deaf and mute person need not be prevented from being presented as a witness in court merely on account of their physical disability. The court explained that a deaf and mute person can testify in writing or through gestures.
 2012 – On 31 August 2012, Grünenthal chief executive Harald F. Stock, PhD, who served as the chief executive officer of Grünenthal GmbH from January 2009 to May 28, 2013, and was also a Member of executive board until May 28, 2013, apologized for the first time for producing thalidomide and remaining silent about the birth defects caused by it. At a ceremony, Stock unveiled a statue of a disabled child to symbolize those harmed by thalidomide and apologized for not trying to reach out to victims for over 50 years. At the time of the apology, there were 5,000 to 6,000 people with the condition still alive. Disability advocates called the apology "insulting" and "too little, too late", and criticized the company for not compensating survivors. They also criticized the company for their claim that no one could have known the harm the drug caused, arguing that there were plenty of red flags at the time.
 2012 – On 17 July 2012, Lynette Rowe of Australia (who was born without limbs due to thalidomide) was awarded an out-of-court settlement, believed to be in the millions of dollars and paving the way for class action victims to receive further compensation.
 2012 – The government of England announced a £2.6 million fund from 2012 until March 2014 to help people with disabilities become MPs, councillors, and police and crime commissioners.
 2012 – Canada's Department of Veterans Affairs ended its policy of deducting the amount of disabled veterans' pensions from benefits for lost earnings and Canadian Forces income support, which were introduced in 2006 under the New Veterans Charter.
 2013 – Turkey officially removed words considered insulting to people with disabilities (such as "gimp" and "faulty") from over 95 of its laws.
 2013 – Guide dogs began to be allowed at the Western Wall, due to a new ruling by Western Wall Rabbi Shmuel Rabinovitch.
 2013  – The Irish Assisted Decision-Making (Capacity) Bill 2013 repealed the Marriage of Lunatics Act, 1811 and the Lunacy Regulation (Ireland) Act 1871.
 2013 – The Mental Health (Discrimination) Act 2013 (introduced into Parliament as the Mental Health (Discrimination) (No. 2) Bill) is an Act of Parliament of the United Kingdom which has four sections. Section 1 ("Members of Parliament etc") removes from the Mental Health Act 1983 the provision that disqualifies from the House of Commons a member sectioned for over six months under that Act. Section 2 ("Jurors") qualifies the restrictions of jury members who are receiving mental health treatment. Section 3 ("Company directors") modifies Regulations in relation to the employment of director's appointments. The final section gives the Secretary of State power to determine when the section relating to juries take effect; the other provisions came into force with Royal Assent.
 2014 – The German national memorial to the people with disabilities systematically murdered by the Nazis was dedicated in 2014 in Berlin. It is located in Berlin in a site next to the Tiergarten park, which is the former location of a villa at Tiergartenstrasse 4 where more than 60 Nazi bureaucrats and doctors worked in secret under the "T4" program to organize the mass murder of sanatorium and psychiatric hospital patients deemed unworthy to live.
 2014 – R v Golds provides a recent authority from the Court of Appeal Criminal Division on how the courts will interpret the term 'substantial' in regard to the Homicide Act 1957 of the United Kingdom. At paragraph [55] of Elias LJ's judgment (following the paragraphing from the neutral citation given below) two senses of the word 'substantial' are identified: (i) something substantial is more than something which is merely trivial or minimal owing to the fact that it has "substance", or (ii) something substantial is big or large (e.g. in the sense that a substantial salary is a large one). At paragraph [72] Elias LJ concludes by opining that the court should (i) leave interpretation of the word 'substantial' to the jury, but if asked for further help should (ii) direct them under the second meaning of the term (i.e. substantial meaning big).
 2014 – The European Court of Justice ruled that if obesity hinders "full and effective participation in professional life," it could count as a disability. Discrimination on the grounds of disability is illegal under European Union law. This ruling came in the case of Karsten Kaltoft, a Danish child-minder who said he was unfairly fired for being fat.
 2014 – In May 2014, the World Health Organization, OHCHR, UN Women, UNAIDS, UNDP, UNFPA and UNICEF issued a joint statement on Eliminating forced, coercive and otherwise involuntary sterilization, An interagency statement. The report references the involuntary sterilization of a number of specific population groups. They include among others, people with disabilities, often perceived as asexual. Women with intellectual disabilities are "often treated as if they have no control, or should have no control, over their sexual and reproductive choices". Other rationales include menstrual management for "women who have or are perceived to have difficulties coping with or managing menses, or whose health conditions (such as epilepsy) or behaviour are negatively affected by menses." The report recommends a range of guiding principles for medical treatment, including ensuring patient autonomy in decision-making, ensuring non-discrimination, accountability and access to remedies.
 2015 – The Inter-American Commission on Human Rights granted precautionary measures to Jessica Liliana Ramirez, who had epidermolysis bullosa, stating that, "The IACHR asks Colombia to adopt the necessary measures in order to preserve the life and personal integrity of the beneficiary, considering the specific aspects of the disease that she faces, with the purpose of ensuring that she has access to proper medical treatment, according to the technical guidances of the Pan-American Health Organization and other international standards that may be applicable," in its ruling.
 2015 – The Court of Protection of the United Kingdom ruled that a woman with six children and an IQ of 70 should be sterilized for her own safety because another pregnancy would have been a "significantly life-threatening event" for her and the fetus.
 2016 - The Rights of Persons with Disabilities Act, 2016 is the disability legislation passed by the Indian Parliament to fulfill its obligation to the United Nations Convention on the Rights of Persons with Disabilities, which India ratified in 2007. The Act replaced the existing Persons With Disabilities (Equal Opportunities, Protection of Rights and Full Participation) Act, 1995. It came into effect on 28 December 2016. This law recognizes 21 disabilities.
 2016 - The Republic Act No. 10754 is an expansion of the benefits and privileges of people with disabilities in the Philippines as an amendment to the Republic Act No. 7277. It highlights the basic and societal benefits and privileges of people with disabilities. It was signed on December 1, 2016.
 2016 - The Sagamihara stabbings were committed on 26 July 2016 in Midori Ward, Sagamihara, Kanagawa, Japan. Nineteen people were killed and twenty-six others were injured, thirteen severely, at a care home for disabled people. Previously that year, the killer, who had worked at the care home, wrote a letter saying, "I envision a world where a person with multiple disabilities can be euthanised, with an agreement from the guardians, when it is difficult for the person to carry out household and social activities." He also wrote that the killings of disabled people would be "for the sake of Japan and world peace" as well as to benefit the global economy and prevent World War III.
 2017 – Authorities in Japan released an official record showing that a girl was forcibly sterilized in 1972 because of her intellectual disability; an official of a civic group stated that this "must be the first disclosure in Japan of a record of an individual who underwent an eugenic sterilization operation."
 2017 – Nepal banned blind people and double amputees from climbing its mountains, including but not limited to Mount Everest. In 2018 the Supreme Court of Nepal overturned the ban.
 2018 – The Supreme Court of the United Kingdom ruled in An NHS Trust and others (Respondents) v Y (by his litigation friend, the Official Solicitor) and another (Appellants) that legal permission was not required to withdraw treatment from patients in a permanent vegetative state.
2018 – In April 2018, Polish protesters organized by Iwona Hartwich participated in a 40-day protest against treatment and social services afforded to persons with disabilities in Poland. The protests were suspended due to a crackdown on protestors by the parliamentary guard. Ultimately, the protests succeeded in achieving one of four demands: an increase in social allowance for disabled persons.
 2019 – Japan passed a law promising to pay each person sterilized under the Eugenic Protection Law 3.2 million yen ($29,000) in compensation. Survivors had five years to apply for compensation, subject to approval by a board of experts.
 2019 - The Accessible Canada Act became law. This was the first national Canadian legislation on accessibility to affect all government departments and federally regulated agencies.
 2019 - Before the May 2019 EU elections, most EU member states adopted laws which enabled all persons with disabilities to be able to vote, in line with Article 29 of the CRPD. Some states did not, and the infringement procedure was initiated at the European Commission.

2020s
 2020 - The Australian National Disability Insurance Scheme (NDIS) begins to fund costs associated with disability. The scheme was legislated in 2013 and went into full operation in 2020. The scheme is administered by the National Disability Insurance Agency (NDIA) and overseen by the NDIS Quality and Safeguards Commission (NDIS Commission).
 2020 - Poland's constitutional court ruled that abortion due to fetal defects was unconstitutional.
 2020 - China lowered the age of criminal responsibility to 12 years old for "abominable" crimes, including but not limited to causing injury that leads to severe disabilities by extremely cruel means.
 2021 - The Supreme Court of Pakistan ruled that prisoners with serious mental health problems cannot receive the death penalty.
 2021 - Spain legalized assisted suicide and euthanasia for those with serious and incurable or debilitating diseases who wish it.
 2021 - Toplak and Mrak v. Slovenia (34591/19, 42545/19) of 26 October 2021, is the European Court of Human Rights judgment in which the court held that voters' rights were violated when they had no legal right to ask for accessible polling places in advance to achieve accessibility before the election day. The ruling is also significant because the court for the first time extended its jurisdiction to referendums.
 2023: An amendment to the constitution of the Netherlands was approved, forbidding discrimination against a person due to their disability (or their sexual orientation).

References

Disability rights
History of disability